With roots dating to 1909, the REALTORS® Association of Edmonton (RAE) is a professional services association of more than 3,500 professionals serving the Greater Edmonton area. Governed by a volunteer board of directors, the association’s membership includes REALTORS® and brokers alike. The association plays an active role in professionally developing its members and in enhancing the reputation of REALTORS® in the community.

History
 1909 - Edmonton Real Estate Exchange Created
 1927 - Edmonton Real Estate Association Created
 1952 - Evolved into the Edmonton Real Estate Board cooperative Listing Bureau Ltd.
 2007 - Name change to REALTORS® Association of Edmonton

See also
 Canadian Real Estate Association
 Alberta Real Estate Association
 Real Estate Council of Alberta

External links
 REALTORS® Association of Edmonton

References

Real estate industry trade groups
Real estate in Canada